Watertown High School (WHS) is a high school located in Watertown, Tennessee. WHS is part of the Wilson County School System.

In addition to Watertown it serves Greenvale, Norene, and Statesville.

2021-2022 School Administration
Principal - Darian Brown
Asst. Principals - Emily Adkisson, Ryan Hill

References

External links
 School website

Public high schools in Tennessee
Schools in Wilson County, Tennessee